Jamie Ingledow (born 23 August 1980) is an English former professional footballer who played in The Football League for Rotherham United, Chesterfield and Halifax Town.

After his professional football career, he played as an amateur for Wakefield & Emley. He then became a professional chef, working in the Lake District.

References

English footballers
Rotherham United F.C. players
Chesterfield F.C. players
Halifax Town A.F.C. players
English Football League players
1980 births
Living people
Association football midfielders